Torsøvej station is a railway station serving the district of Risskov in the northern part of the city of Aarhus in Jutland, Denmark. The station is located on the Grenaa railway line between Aarhus and Grenaa. Since 2019, the station has been served by the Aarhus light rail system, a tram-train network combining tram lines in the city of Aarhus with operation on railway lines in the surrounding countryside.

References

External links

 Banedanmark
 DSB

Railway stations in Aarhus